What to Look for in Summer is a double live album by Belle and Sebastian, released on 11 December 2020. The songs were culled from their 2019 world tour and Boaty Weekender tour.

Background
The album was announced alongside the release of music videos for the live versions of "The Boy with the Arab Strap" and "My Wandering Days are Over" which appear on the album. The band took inspiration from progressive rock band Yes's Yessongs and hard rock band Thin Lizzy's Live and Dangerous; the initial title for the album was "Live and Meticulous", before bandleader Stuart Murdoch vetoed it, calling it "derivative".

Track listing
Adapted from press release.

References

2020 live albums
Belle and Sebastian live albums